The 49th Baeksang Arts Awards ceremony was held at Kyung Hee University's Peace Palace Hall in Seoul on 9 May 2013, and broadcast on jTBC. Presented by IS Plus Corp., it was hosted by announcer Oh Sang-jin, actress Kim Ah-joong, and actor Joo Won.

Nominations and winners
Complete list of nominees and winners:

(Winners denoted in bold)

Film

Television

References

External links
 
 

Baeksang
Baeksang
Baeksang Arts Awards
Baek
Baek
2010s in Seoul
2013 in South Korea